Marcel Vauthier (November 6, 1910 – May 26, 1988) was a French politician.

Vauthier was born in Saint-Denis, Reunion and died in the same city. A lawyer by profession, he was an MP and Senator under the French Fourth Republic and the beginning of the Fifth Republic.

Mandates 
 Member of the French Assembly representing Réunion within the Popular Republican Movement from June 29 to November 27, 1946.
 Senator of Reunion within the Popular Republican Movement from November 7, 1948 to 18 June 1955. He is not re-elected at the end of this mandate.
 Member of the French Assembly representing Reunion within the group Democratic Centre from 5 May 1963 to 2 April 1967.

External links 
Bio on the French National Assembly website.
Bio on the French Senate website.

1910 births
1988 deaths
Senators of Réunion